Jon Hyde was the singer for the early 1970s group Hokus Pokus, who had one album on Romar Records in the early 1970s, featuring former Stooges keyboard player Scott Thurston, former Yellow Payges drummer Danny Gorman and former Steppenwolf guitarist Michael Monarch and bass Billy Cioffi. They played the Hollywood clubs quite a bit at that time, and were regular patrons of Rodney Bingenheimer's club on Sunset. Jon and Michael Monarch later formed Detective with Michael Des Barres from Silverhead and signed with Led Zeppelin's Swan Song Records. Jon was the drummer for Detective but wrote most of the lyrics and material, as he was a lead singer himself. He did the drumming on the Hokus Pokus album as well.

Hyde is a stage name. He was in Hollywood so long, and played with so many musicians, he has a long history besides Hokus Pokus and Detective. His singing voice is similar to both Rod Stewart's and Michael Des Barres, throaty and raspy, but with more soul and feel. His drumming style has been compared to John Bonham's.
Jon Hyde has a long history outside of Hokus Pokus and Detective. After Detective, Jon reorganized Hokus Pokus with only Monarch remaining from the original lineup, adding Frankie Banali on drums. This was in 1980 and they played at the Deja Vu in Costa Mesa among other clubs. Monarch then formed Monarch, first with Bob Bentrup on drums and later with Hyde. Monarch had a similar style and feel to Hokus Pokus and Detective. More recently, Hyde has reorganized Hokus Pokus and similar groups many times, both as drummer and lead singer. He still resides in Los Angeles and can be found on Facebook and on the Detective website, www.detective-theband.com

References
https://web.archive.org/web/20110719025840/http://www.desbarres.com/biography.html has a small picture and confirms who he played with.

Living people
American male singers
Year of birth missing (living people)